Jan Drenth (born 20 February 1925) is a Dutch chemist. He was a professor of structural chemistry at the University of Groningen from 1969 to 1990.

Career
Drenth was born in Groningen. He obtained his PhD in mathematics and physics under Eelco Wiebenga at the University of Groningen in 1957, with a dissertation titled: Een röntgenografisch onderzoek van excelsine, edestine en tabakszaadglobuline. Drenth subsequently moved to New York, United States, where he became a post-doc and studied protein crystallography under Barbara Low. Drenth then returned to the Netherlands and in 1967 was appointed as lector. In 1969 he was appointed as professor of structural chemistry, which he remained until his retirement in 1990.

Drenth was elected a member of the Royal Netherlands Academy of Arts and Sciences in 1973.

Works
 Principles of Protein X-Ray Crystallography.

References

1925 births
Living people
20th-century Dutch chemists
Crystallographers
Members of the Royal Netherlands Academy of Arts and Sciences
Scientists from Groningen (city)
University of Groningen alumni
Academic staff of the University of Groningen